Sandra Drzymalska (born 24 July 1993) is a Polish actress.

Career 
She was awarded a master's degree in dramatic acting from the AST National Academy of Theatre Arts in Kraków in 2017.
She played a minor role in the 2019 drama film Sole directed by Carlo Sironi.
In 2021 she gained recognition for playing a student in the Netflix series Sexify.
In October, 2021 she appeared on the cover of Vogue Polska, the Polish edition of Vogue.
She played Kasandra in Jerzy Skolimowski's 2022 film EO.

Filmography

References

External links
 
 Sandra Drzymalska at filmpolski.pl database

1993 births
Polish film actresses
Polish television actresses
21st-century Polish actresses

Living people